John Adams (by 1511 – 1571/1575), of Peterchurch in Pembroke and St Petrox, Pembrokeshire, was a Welsh politician.

Career
Adams was a Member of Parliament for Pembroke Boroughs in 1542.

References

1570s deaths
People from Pembroke, Pembrokeshire
Members of the Parliament of England (pre-1707) for constituencies in Wales
16th-century Welsh politicians
English MPs 1542–1544
Year of birth uncertain